The Clach na Bratach, also known as the Stone of the Standard, is a charm-stone believed to have magical properties that was owned by the Clan Robertson. It is a globe of transparent crystal that was described by antiquarian James Simpson as "about the size of a small apple. It was allegedly found by Duncan Ard (b. 1275) in 1315 on his way to Bannockburn. It was believed to heal illness in domestic animals and people, and had some clairvoyant properties. If it clouded over, it foretold ill-fortune in battle.

References

Scottish folklore